Haldan Keffer Hartline  (December 22, 1903 – March 17, 1983) was an American physiologist who was a co-recipient (with George Wald and Ragnar Granit) of the 1967 Nobel Prize in Physiology or Medicine for his work in analyzing the neurophysiological mechanisms of vision.

Education
Hartline did his undergraduate studies at Lafayette College in Easton, Pennsylvania, graduating in 1923. He began his study of retinal electrophysiology as a National Research Council Fellow at Johns Hopkins School of Medicine, receiving his medical degree in 1927.

Career and research
After attending the universities of Leipzig and Munich as an Eldridge Johnson traveling research scholar from the University of Pennsylvania, he returned to the US to take a position in the Eldridge Reeves Johnson Foundation for Medical Physics at Penn, which was under the directorship of Detlev W. Bronk at that time. In 1940–1941, he was Associate Professor of Physiology at Cornell Medical College in New York City, but returned to Penn and stayed until 1949. Then he became professor of biophysics and chairman of the department at Johns Hopkins School of Medicine in 1949. One of Hartline's graduate students at Johns Hopkins School of Medicine, Paul Greengard, who also won the Nobel Prize. Hartline joined the staff of Rockefeller University, New York City, in 1953 as professor of neurophysiology.

Hartline investigated the electrical responses of the retinas of certain arthropods, vertebrates, and mollusks, because their visual systems are much simpler than those of humans and thus easier to study. He concentrated his studies on the eye of the horseshoe crab (Limulus polyphemus). Using minute electrodes, he obtained the first record of the electrical impulses sent by a single optic nerve fibre when the receptors connected to it are stimulated by light. He found that the photoreceptor cells in the eye are interconnected in such a way that when one is stimulated, others nearby are depressed, thus enhancing the contrast in light patterns and sharpening the perception of shapes. Hartline thus built up a detailed understanding of the workings of individual photoreceptors and nerve fibres in the retina, and he showed how simple retinal mechanisms constitute vital steps in the integration of visual information.

Awards and honors
In 1948, Hartline was elected to the United States National Academy of Sciences. He was elected to the American Philosophical Society in 1952 and the American Academy of Arts and Sciences in 1957. Hartline was elected a Foreign Member of the Royal Society (ForMemRS) in 1966. He was awarded the  Nobel Prize in Physiology or Medicine  in 1967.

Personal life 
Hartline married Elizabeth Kraus Hartline in 1936. They had three children.

References

External links
 

Nobel laureates in Physiology or Medicine
American Nobel laureates
Members of the United States National Academy of Sciences
American neuroscientists
1903 births
1983 deaths
People from Bloomsburg, Pennsylvania
Physicians from Pennsylvania
Johns Hopkins University alumni
Foreign Members of the Royal Society
Medical physicists
Lafayette College alumni
Members of the American Philosophical Society